
Gmina Łosice is an urban-rural gmina (administrative district) in Łosice County, Masovian Voivodeship, in east-central Poland.

Villages
Apart from the town of Łosice, Gmina Łosice contains the villages and settlements of Biernaty Średnie, Chotycze, Chotycze-Kolonia, Czuchleby, Dzięcioły, Jeziory, Łuzki, Meszki, Niemojki, Niemojki-Stacja, Nowosielec, Patków, Prusy, Rudnik, Stare Biernaty, Świniarów, Szańków, Szańków-Kolonia, Toporów, Woźniki and Zakrze.

Neighbouring gminas
Gmina Łosice is bordered by the gminas of Huszlew, Mordy, Olszanka, Platerów, Przesmyki and Stara Kornica.

References

Polish official population figures 2006

Losice
Łosice County